MultiVersus is a 2022 free-to-play crossover fighting game developed by Player First Games and published by Warner Bros. Games for PlayStation 4, PlayStation 5, Windows, Xbox One, and Xbox Series X/S. The game features characters from Warner Bros. Entertainment franchises.

Officially announced in November 2021 following online rumors and leaks, early access and open beta versions of the game released in July 2022.

Gameplay
MultiVersus is a platform fighter, with players battling on different stages and attempting to knock the opponent beyond the stage's boundary by dealing sufficient damage. While 1-vs-1 and free-for-all options are available, the game emphasizes battling in teams of two characters; most attacks in the game are designed with this in mind, including other players passively strengthening the move's effect.

MultiVersus features a perk system, which allows players to customize their characters with passive abilities that will also affect their partners in Teams. These include Signature Perks, which are exclusive to a respective character and directly affect their attributes and abilities. If players in the same team equip the same perks, those perks' effects are enhanced.

Currencies and Season Pass 
MultiVersus features two currencies: Gold, which is primarily used to purchase characters and train perks; and Gleamium, a premium currency that can be used to buy variants, taunts, banners, and Premium Season Passes in addition to characters. Gold is obtained by normally playing the game through various means, while Gleamium is purchasable with real-world currencies. During certain events, specific tokens can be earned by playing in any mode and playing with specific character variants doubles the amount. These currencies can be used to purchase cosmetic items or, in the case of candy during the Monster Mash event, traded for Gold, with 10 Gold for every 500 candy units.

The Season Pass contains two tiers: Normal, which is free for all players; and Premium, which requires Gleamium to purchase. In both tiers, players earn points by completing daily and seasonal missions. Obtainable items include gold, toast and cosmetics such as banners and ring-out effects. Progress in both tiers is tied; if the Premium tier is purchased after progress is made on the Normal tier, all rewards will retroactively be obtained.

Playable characters 
, MultiVersus features 23 playable characters. With one exception, Reindog, these characters originate from the intellectual properties of Warner Bros. Discovery. Voice acting is prominently emphasized, and several voice actors reprise their respective roles from other media. Characters can be any one of five classes—Assassin, Bruiser, Mage, Support, and Tank—and are best suited for covering a specific direction, these being horizontal, vertical, or hybrid.

Every character has at least one playable variant, some of which have different voice actors or dialogue from the default variant. Characters can be unlocked through gameplay, or purchased using gold, Gleamium, or Character Tickets included with the Founder's Pack content packages; four specific characters are also playable for all users on a rotating basis. The game's open beta initially launched with 17 characters, with new characters frequently added in subsequent updates.

Development

The game is developed by Player First Games. Dedicated servers, rollback netcode, and voice acting have been promoted as prominent features, and the team intend to release new content and characters via constant updates. The game held a closed alpha test from February 25–March 8, 2022.

Background
Prior to its announcement in November 2021, rumors of the game surfaced from multiple sources. Initially, a user on the subreddit r/GamingLeaksandRumours claimed that the game was in development as early as 2019 following the release of Super Smash Bros. Ultimate and Warner Bros.' acknowledgement of the Ultra Instinct Shaggy internet meme. The user also claimed that the idea of a crossover influenced the filming of Space Jam: A New Legacy, although the validity of these claims is uncertain.

On October 27, 2021, professional Super Smash Bros. player Juan "Hungrybox" DeBiedma shared an image on Twitter showing what he alleged was the character selection screen for MultiVersus. The image was deleted after Warner Bros. submitted a DMCA takedown request, which DeBiedma stated was a "hard confirm" of the photograph's veracity. The image included Gandalf and Rick Sanchez as playable characters in place of Arya Stark and Garnet, and Superman and Steven Universe's designs were updated to be shown in the trailer. Jeff Grubb, a gaming insider, confirmed that LeBron James would feature in the game. Internal game design documents for the game were leaked on ResetEra. Following the tech test, gameplay footage was leaked online.

On May 26, 2022, a subsequent leak revealed additional playable characters, including Daenerys Targaryen, Ted Lasso, Morty Smith, and Marvin the Martian.

Early access and open beta
An early access version was released on July 19 for participants of selected events, including the game's closed playtests and those competing in the game's first 2v2 tournament at the 2022 Evolution Championship Series, and via Twitch's Drops reward system and purchasable founder's packs.

During the 2022 San Diego Comic-Con event, Rick Sanchez, Morty Smith, and LeBron James were announced as playable characters. The open beta was released on July 26, 2022, serving as a soft launch for the game.

The Founder's Pack for the PC version is distributed through Steam and the Epic Games Store. Console versions are distributed through Microsoft Store for Xbox consoles and the PlayStation Store for PlayStation consoles. It is available in Standard, Deluxe, and Premium editions.

During the open beta, Bugs Bunny players held the number-one ranked slot in both 1-v-1 and 2-v-2 leaderboards. The character's prevalence among top-ranked 2-v-2 players was notable, leading to changes to Bugs' abilities and those of Wonder Woman implemented after EVO 2022.

MultiVersus' first season was originally scheduled to launch on August 9, 2022, but was delayed to August 15.

Patches
Since the game's release, various characters' abilities have been frequently modified. A notable instance is one of Velma Dinkley's abilities; the police car featured in that move was replaced with the Mystery Machine.

Reception

The game received generally positive reviews during its open beta. IGN wrote "MultiVersus may not be a must-play at social gatherings, but its refreshing team-based battles make it a great platform fighter online." Play summarized that it was "full of love for the characters, and crunchy to play, you owe it to yourself to give this a go – though the monetisation methods are off-putting."

Its launch on Steam was the most successful for a WB Games title, and the biggest launch for a fighting game released on the platform.

The game topped the American sales charts for July 2022, falling to number 5 the following month. It was the most downloaded game on the US PlayStation Store for the same month, and number 2 in Europe. It also topped the sales charts in Australia. It was the most popular title on the Steam Deck platform.

By August 2022, the game had reached 10 million players. By September, it had reached 20 million.
By February 2023, the game reportedly experienced a significant drop in daily players. Trackers for the Windows version reported roughly 1,300 players in the last 30 days, marking the title's lowest player count since launch.

Notes

References

External links
 
 

2022 video games
Adventure Time video games
Cartoon Network video games
Crossover fighting games
Early access video games
Free-to-play video games
Gremlins (franchise)
LeBron James
Multiplayer and single-player video games
Platform fighters
PlayStation 4 games
PlayStation 5 games
Space Jam
Superhero crossover video games
Video games based on animated television series
Video games based on A Song of Ice and Fire
Video games based on DC Comics
Video games based on Rick and Morty
Video games based on Scooby-Doo
Video games based on Steven Universe
Video games based on television series
Video games based on Tom and Jerry
Video games developed in the United States
Video games featuring Bugs Bunny
Video games featuring the Tasmanian Devil (Looney Tunes)
Video games with downloadable content
Video games with user-generated gameplay content
Warner Bros. video games
Windows games
Xbox One games
Xbox Series X and Series S games
D.I.C.E. Award for Fighting Game of the Year winners
The Game Awards winners